is a media franchise created by the internet television variety show 2.5 Jigen Terebi. It consists of an iOS game titled Magica Wars Lock-On which was released on December 20, 2013; a free-to-play smartphone browser game by DMM Games titled Magica Wars Tactics, released in January 2014; a PlayStation Vita game was released on March 27, 2014; and an anime television series by Gainax that aired on April 8, 2014.

The franchise personifies Japan's 47 prefectures, each one being represented by a magical girl. The character designs are determined via a contest on the art website Pixiv. The voice actress for each girl was born in the prefecture that they represent.

Story
The dragon sleeps under the ground of this land…
It gives an abundant harvest on the land when sleeping, but brings a disaster when it is awake. 
In every decade or hundreds of years, the dragon moves its body as if it tosses about unconsciously. The movement becomes the distortion and causes impurity. With the magical weapon the power of Gods, the “Magica” will fight to stop evils in Japan.

Characters

Representative of Miyagi Prefecture.

Representative of Miyagi Prefecture.
 

Representative of Tokyo Prefecture.

Representative of Tokyo Prefecture.
 

Representative of Ishikawa Prefecture.

Representative of Ishikawa Prefecture.

Representative of Shizuoka Prefecture.

Representative of Shizuoka Prefecture.
 

Representative of Mie Prefecture.

Representative of Mie Prefecture.

Representative of Kyoto Prefecture.

Representative of Kyoto Prefecture.
 

Representative of Kumamoto Prefecture.

Representative of Kumamoto Prefecture.

Main protagonist of Zanbatsu.

Production

Development
Magica Wars is a concept created by the Web-based otaku-oriented news program 2.5 Jigen Terebi as an original content project that aims to create characters based on the 47 prefectures of Japan. It began as a character design contest for each of the 47 prefectures, and is currently composed of three games, an anime series and a manga serialization.

The Magica Wars concept started development on June 28, 2012, coinciding the premiere of 2.5 Jigen Terebi. Using the concept of "livening up one's locale", a character design contest was hosted on the illustration SNS Pixiv during June 28 to August 8 wherein each entry consists of a magical girl and her familiar. By the end of the contest, a staggering 3,248 entries from Japan and other countries joined the period. Of these entries, 60 were chosen as official designs for the magical girls that would represent the 47 prefectures of Japan and Taiwan, with 3D sprites especially made for three of these entries, which are representatives for the Miyagi, Aomori and Kanagawa prefectures.

After the selection of the 60 entries from the character design contest, three games were green-lit for release. Two of these games, Magica Wars Lock On! and Magica Wars Tactics, were designed for smartphones, while a third, Magica Wars Zanbatsu, is released for the PlayStation Vita handheld console. An anime series and a manga based on the concept were also green-lit. Each project has a different number of cast of Magical Girls, the anime and manga having the fewest featured. The Zanbatsu game featured 47 prefecture magical girls, two original girls, the amnesiac protagonist Sakaki Amane and another original character Maki Inada who gives the amnesiac Amane her name and is the first person who Amane meets; also guest starring in Zanbatsu are some Magatsuhi-corrupted magical girl cast from Lock-On as antagonists. The Zanbatsu game ended service on December 22, 2015 after slightly over a year's run from March 2014.

Anime

Episode list

References

External links

2013 video games
2014 video games
2014 anime television series debuts
Anime television series based on video games
Browser games
Flash games
Free-to-play video games
Gainax
IOS games
IOS-only games
Japan-exclusive video games
Magical girl anime and manga
PlayStation Vita games
PlayStation Vita-only games
Video games developed in Japan